The Revealers is a 2003 teen's novel by American author Doug Wilhelm about bullying in middle school.

Plot summary

Sequel
In March 2012, a sequel was released, titled True Shoes.

References

2003 American novels
American children's novels
Novels about bullying
Novels set in high schools and secondary schools
2003 children's books

THE END